Cyril Eboki Poh (born 11 September 1979 in Montreuil) is a French former professional footballer who played as a striker. He played on the professional level in Ligue 1 for AS Cannes and SC Bastia and in Ligue 2 for AS Cannes.

Career
Eboki had a trial for Burnley and played in a friendly match against Dundee United.

References

External links
 

1979 births
Living people
Association football forwards
French footballers
Ligue 1 players
Ligue 2 players
Championnat National 2 players
Championnat National 3 players
AS Cannes players
SC Bastia players
CA Bastia players
AS Furiani-Agliani players